IA Clarington Investments Inc. is an investment management firm catering to the Canadian retail market. A wholly owned subsidiary of iA Financial Group (TSX: IFG), the company sells various products, including mutual funds, portfolios, exchange-traded series of mutual funds, segregated funds and socially responsible investments. Except for its exchange-traded series, iA Clarington products can only be purchased through licensed, third-party financial advisors.

History

The company was founded in 1996 by Terry Stone, Adrian Brouwers and Sal Tino as Clarington Corporation, and operated principally through its wholly owned subsidiary, ClaringtonFunds Inc. In December 2003, Clarington Corporation went public. In 2005, it was acquired by iA Financial Group, which rebranded the Clarington funds, along with existing Industrial Alliance mandates, under the iA Clarington Investments name.

List of Portfolio Managers
iA Clarington funds are managed by either in-house portfolio managers or external sub-advisors. The following list is as at January 31, 2023:  

 Industrial Alliance Investment Management Inc.
 Loomis, Sayles & Company, L.P.

 QV Investors Inc.
 Vancity Investment Management Ltd. 
 Wellington Square

See also

 List of mutual-fund families in Canada

References

External links
 

Financial services companies of Canada
Canada